Petro Vasyliovych Yurchyshyn (born 13 July 1958) is a Ukrainian politician currently serving as a People's Deputy of Ukraine of the 8th and 9th convocations. He was previously a member of the Khmilnytsky District Council of the 5th and 6th convocations.

Biography 
From 1973 to 1977 he studied at the Kamyanets-Podilsky Agricultural Technical School and received a diploma in mechanical engineering. After graduation, he worked as a senior and later as a chief engineer in the collective farm "Family" (ua: "Родина")  Starosinyavsky district of Khmelnytsky region. 

1978–1980 - conscript service in the Soviet Army. 1980–1981 - engineer of the Khmilnytsky District Department of Agriculture. 1981–1983 - Chief Engineer of the Great Poultry Farm. 1983–1987 - supply and sales department of Khmelnytsky food factory.

1987–1992 - worked in the system of consumer cooperation. In 1992 he graduated from Vinnytsia Polytechnic Institute, majoring in mechanical engineering. From 1993 to 2001 he was the director of "Experiment" (ua: "Експеримент") LLC. Since 2001 - Director of the agro-industrial research and production enterprise "Visit" (ua: "Візит"). Member of the Khmilnytsky District Council of the 5th and 6th convocations.

Parliamentary activity 
In 2014, he was elected People's Deputy of Ukraine of the VIII convocation in constituency № 13, Vinnytsia region, self-nominated.

Date of taking office on December 4, 2014.

Member of the Bloc of Petro Poroshenko parliamentary faction.

Chairman of the Subcommittee on Food Industry and Trade in Agro-industrial Goods of the Verkhovna Rada Committee on Agrarian Policy and Land Relations.

State awards 
Diploma of the Cabinet of Ministers of Ukraine (2004)

Honored Worker of Agriculture of Ukraine (2006)

References 

Petro Poroshenko Bloc politicians
Eighth convocation members of the Verkhovna Rada
Living people
People from Antratsyt
1958 births
Recipients of the Honorary Diploma of the Cabinet of Ministers of Ukraine